Fadl ibn Shavur ibn Manuchihr was a Shaddadid emir of Ani from  1125 to 1130.

A son of the deposed emir Abu'l-Aswar Shavur, Fadl was able to retake Ani from the Georgians, but promised to observe the rights of its Christian population. Fadl extended his rule to Dvin and Ganja, but failed to maintain these cities. He was murdered by his courtiers following the fall of Dvin to the Turkish emir Qurti c. 1130. His brothers, Mahmud ibn Shavur and Khushchikr, ruled briefly in quick succession until the emirate was taken over by Fadl's nephew, Fakr al-Din Shaddad b. Mahmud.

References 

Shaddadid emirs of Ani
12th-century rulers in Asia
12th-century Kurdish people